The 1997 Philadelphia Eagles season was the franchise's 65th season in the National Football League. The team failed to improve on their previous output of 10–6, going only 6–9–1 and failing to reach the playoffs for the first time in three seasons.
This was the season where the team was sponsored by the “Starters” brand.
Lowlights of the 1997 campaign include a disheartening one-point loss at Dallas in Week 3, where starter Ty Detmer led the Birds on a potential game-winning drive late in regulation, only to see holder Tommy Hutton botch the hold on what would have been the deciding field goal from ex-Cowboys kicker Chris Boniol. In Week 7, the Eagles lost their first-ever game against the three-season-old Jacksonville Jaguars, and on November 10, in a Monday Night Football 24–12 home loss against San Francisco, a fan was spotted firing a flare gun in the upper deck. Six days later, at Memorial Stadium, the Eagles and Ravens engaged in a 10–10 tie. This was Eagles' first tie since 1986 against the Cardinals.

One bright spot during the year came on the Sunday after Thanksgiving, when second-year Bobby Hoying stepped in under center and threw for a career-high 313 yards and four touchdowns in a 44–42 win against the Cincinnati Bengals.

The 1997 campaign was notable in that it ended a 13-year radio partnership between broadcasters Merrill Reese and former Eagle Stan Walters on 94 WIP. Mike Quick became the color commentator the following season.

Offseason

NFL draft 
The table shows the Eagles selections and what picks they had that were traded away and the team that ended up with that pick. It is possible the Eagles' pick ended up with this team via another team that the Eagles made a trade with.
Not shown are acquired picks that the Eagles traded away.

Staff

Roster

Regular season

Schedule 

Note: Intra-division opponents are in bold text.

Standings

Notes

References

External links 
 1997 Philadelphia Eagles at Pro-Football-Reference.com

Philadelphia Eagles seasons
Philadelphia Eagles
Philadelphia Eagles